Johann Nepomuck of Limburg Stirum, count of Limburg Styrum, sovereign lord zu Gemen, son of Alois of Limburg Stirum, was born in 1756.  He married in 1784 Maria Walpurga vom Stain (born 1767, died 1787) and they had issue:
	
 Ferdinand IV, count of Limburg Styrum zu Illereichen, sovereign lord zu Gemen (born 1785, died 1800);
 Carl Heinrich, count of Limburg Styrum (born 1786, died before 1800).

Johann Nepomuck died in 1791.

1756 births
1791 deaths
Johann Of Limburg Stirum